Tom Watkins is a former member of the Ohio House of Representatives.

Living people
Year of birth missing (living people)
Place of birth missing (living people)
Republican Party members of the Ohio House of Representatives
20th-century American politicians